Juan Pablo Gargiulo (born 16 January 1992) is an Argentine footballer who plays as a defender for Eccellenza side Albenga.

Club career
Gargiulo started his career in his home town club Aldosivi, playing in the Primera B Nacional. He signed to Spain in 2016 to lower league team Quintanar del Rey. He spent here only 7 months, before he was sold to Marbella. On the next day, the Segunda División B team loaned him to Italian Lega Pro side Mantova. At the end of 2016–17 season, Serie D side Albissola signed him.

On 30 July 2019, he joined Eccellenza side Albenga.

References

Sources
 
 

1992 births
Living people
Sportspeople from Mar del Plata
Association football defenders
Argentine footballers
Argentine expatriate footballers
Argentine expatriate sportspeople in Spain
Argentine expatriate sportspeople in Italy
Expatriate footballers in Spain
Expatriate footballers in Italy
Primera Nacional players
Serie C players
Serie D players
Aldosivi footballers
Marbella FC players
Mantova 1911 players
Albissola 2010 players